Xavery is a surname. Notable people with the name include:

Frans Xavery (1740–after 1772),  Dutch painter
Gerard Joseph Xavery (1700–1747), Dutch painter
Jacob Xavery (1736–after 1771), Dutch painter
Jan Baptist Xavery (1697–1742), Flemish sculptor
Pieter Xavery (1647–after 1674), Flemish Baroque sculptor